William (Bill) Joseph Petrek (February 26, 1928 - May 7, 2011) was an American philosopher and professor of philosophy at Hofstra University. He was the President of The American International University in London, England.
He was also a former provost of Hofstra University.

References

20th-century American philosophers
Philosophy academics
Hofstra University faculty
1928 births
2011 deaths